Saulo Decarli (born 4 February 1992) is a Swiss footballer who plays as a central defender for German  club Eintracht Braunschweig.

Career

In 2013, Decarli was signed by Italian Serie B club Livorno. For the second half of the 2013–14 season he played for Serie B club A.S. Avellino 1912, on loan from Livorno.

On 29 June 2014, Eintracht Braunschweig announced that Decarli had signed a five-year contract with the club. At the end of July 2017, he was temporarily demoted to the club's reserves for "team-damaging behaviour". Subsequently, he was not called up to the first-team squad by manager Torsten Lieberknecht while making one appearance for the reserves.

On 21 August 2017, he transferred to Club Brugge on a three-year deal. The transfer fee paid to Braunschweig was not disclosed.

On 11 June 2019, Bochum announced Decarli as their new signing, for an undisclosed fee. He will take the number 5 jersey. 

On 3 June 2022, Eintracht Braunschweig announced the return of Decarli on a free transfer.

Career statistics

Club

Honours 

 Clubs

 Club Brugge K.V

 Belgian Pro League: 2017–18
 Belgian Super Cup: 2018

 Bochum

2.Bundesliga: 2020-21

References

External links

1992 births
Living people
Swiss men's footballers
Switzerland under-21 international footballers
Switzerland youth international footballers
Association football defenders
FC Locarno players
FC Chiasso players
U.S. Livorno 1915 players
U.S. Avellino 1912 players
Eintracht Braunschweig players
Eintracht Braunschweig II players
Club Brugge KV players
VfL Bochum players
Swiss Challenge League players
Serie B players
Bundesliga players
2. Bundesliga players
Regionalliga players
Belgian Pro League players
Swiss expatriate footballers
Swiss expatriate sportspeople in Italy
Swiss expatriate sportspeople in Germany
Expatriate footballers in Italy
Expatriate footballers in Germany
Expatriate footballers in Belgium
People from Locarno
Sportspeople from Ticino